Smiljanić is a surname found in Serbia and Croatia, derived from the given names Smilja (feminine) or Smiljan (masculine).

Notable people with the name include:

 Smiljanić family, a medieval family in Venetian Dalmatia
 Aleksandra Smiljanić, Serbian professor
 Branko Smiljanić, Serbian football manager
 Boris Smiljanić, Swiss footballer of Croatian descent
 Božidar Smiljanić (1936–2018), Yugoslav and Croatian actor
 Goran Smiljanić, Serbian footballer
 Mićo Smiljanić, Serbian footballer
 Milan Smiljanić, Serbian footballer
 Vladana Likar-Smiljanic, Serbian illustrator
 Živorad Smiljanić, Serbian politician

See also
Miljanić

Serbian surnames
Croatian surnames